Vivian Bruce Peterson (born 14 February 1942) is a former Australian rules footballer who played with North Melbourne in the Victorian Football League (VFL).

Notes

External links 

Viv Peterson's playing statistics from The VFA Project

Living people
1942 births
Australian rules footballers from Victoria (Australia)
North Melbourne Football Club players
Preston Football Club (VFA) players